Ashley-Famous was a talent agency started in 1955 by talent agent Ted Ashley. The agency had a successful 16-year run under that name and owner; it was responsible for many hit television shows and had several famous clients. It changed ownership a few times, but it is still a functioning talent agency today.

Beginnings under Ted Ashley
Ted Ashley had been working at the William Morris Agency, where he started off as a talent agent at the age of 20, when in 1955 he decided to break off and start his own talent agency at the age of 23. It started out in New York City as Ted Ashley and Associates. In 1950, he was joined by William Morris agent Ira L. Steiner and the agency was renamed the Ashley-Steiner Agency.

In 1962, he purchased the Famous Artists Agency from Charles K. Feldman and renamed the agency Ashley-Steiner-Famous Artists. In 1964, Steiner resigned to form his own film production company and the agency was renamed Ashley-Famous. Ashley was a very skilled talent agent and would lead top clients away from their agencies and bring them to his establishment. It is said that he is responsible for putting over 100 television shows on the air during his time at this agency. As owner of the agency, Ashley would have made circa 10% on each production. He left the agency in 1967 to accept an offer to be CEO of  Warner Bros. Inc.

Television
One of Ashley-Famous's claim to fame was their ability to market and sell hit television series. Many of the series ended up being cult classics and staples of popular culture, both in their time period and in current times. A few examples of these includeCandid Camera, Juvenile Jury, The Danny Kaye Show, Mission: Impossible, Get Smart, The Carol Burnett Show, Medic, Star Trek, Dr. Kildare, The Defenders, Tarzan, Name That Tune, The Twilight Zone and The Doris Day Show. These television shows were of all different genres including science fiction, spy fiction and parodies, and game shows.

Clients
The talent agency represented clients from the entire spectrum of the entertainment industry including musicians, playwrights, and actors and actresses from both the big and small screens.  Some of their more famous musical clients included Perry Como, Trini Lopez, Janis Joplin, The Doors, and Iron Butterfly. In the film industry, they represented Burt Lancaster, Rex Harrison, Yul Brynner, and Ingrid Bergman. Arthur Miller was one of the playwrights they represented.

Changes in ownership
In 1967, Ted Ashley sold Ashley-Famous to Steve Ross, an entrepreneur in charge of Kinney National Company, in exchange for 12,750,000 in Kinney stock because of personal reasons that involved not wanting to be an agent anymore.  In an interview, Ashley quotes, "There’s something undermining to one’s sense of one’s self about that whole relationship" (referencing the agent and client partnership). It was sold again in 1969 because of conflicts of interest that violated the anti-trust laws. It separated from Warner Bros. which was run by another Ashley brother and it became known as International Famous Agency (IFA). In 1975, IFA merged with Creative Management Associates (CMA) and then became what is known today as International Creative Management.

Current name and owner
International Creative Management is still a successful talent agency and like its original agency, has clients from all different areas of the entertainment industry. It is also responsible for the packaging of many hit television series, such as Grey's Anatomy, Dancing with the Stars, Modern Family, The Big Bang Theory, Criminal Minds, Undercover Boss, Cougar Town, House, Breaking Bad, The Simpsons, Two and a Half Men, Sons of Anarchy, Psych, The Ellen DeGeneres Show, America's Next Top Model, Kitchen Nightmares, Last Comic Standing, Friends, Army Wives, Cheers, Sex and the City, Frasier, Scrubs, and The X-Files, just like its former name was.

References

External links
 Deathwatch Ted Ashley
 

Defunct mass media companies of the United States
Business services companies established in 1955
1955 establishments in New York City
Companies disestablished in 1975
1975 disestablishments in California
1975 mergers and acquisitions
Former Time Warner subsidiaries